Microbacterium terricola is a Gram-positive and non-motile bacterium from the genus Microbacterium which has been isolated from soil from Japan.

References 

Bacteria described in 2007
terricola